The 2002 Gran Premio Telmex-Gigante was the nineteenth and final round of the 2002 CART FedEx Champ Car World Series season, held on November 17, 2002 at the Autódromo Hermanos Rodríguez in Mexico City, Mexico.  It was the first Champ Car race at the track since the 1981 season. The race preceded a mass exodus of significant drivers and teams who all competed in their final Champ Car event, most of whom knew beforehand that they would not return. Most rued the fact that they were leaving for the rival Indy Racing League, wishing to continue in CART rather than endure a more stable future in the IRL. CART's winningest driver (42 wins), Michael Andretti, along with Kenny Brack, Scott Dixon, Dario Franchitti, Tony Kanaan, and Japan's most successful driver in U.S. open wheel racing Tora Takagi would all bid CART adieu in favor of the IRL. Other entities leaving CART included 1996-1999 champions Chip Ganassi Racing, 1995 champions Team KOOL Green, and Mo Nunn Racing permanently switched to the IRL, and Japanese automotive industry giants Honda and Toyota likewise left CART for the IRL. Season champion Cristiano da Matta was set to leave CART for Formula One with his engine supplier's F1 team, and Christian Fittipaldi attempted a stock car career.

Qualifying results

Race

Caution flags

Notes 

 New Track Record Bruno Junqueira 1:25.941 (Qualification session #1)
 New Race Record Kenny Bräck 1:56:48.475
 Average Speed 104.468 mph

External links

 Friday Qualifying Results
 Saturday Qualifying Results
 Race Results

Mexico City
Gran Premio Telmex-gigante, 2002
Gran Premio Tecate